Mark Sension (also Mark St. John) (1630 – August 12, 1693) was an early settler of Norwalk, Connecticut. He was a deputy of the Connecticut General Assembly of the Colony of Connecticut from Norwalk in the sessions of October 1672, October 1676, October 1678, and May and October 1684.

References 

1630 births
1693 deaths

Burials in East Norwalk Historical Cemetery

Settlers of Connecticut
People from colonial Boston
Politicians from Norwalk, Connecticut
Deputies of the Connecticut General Assembly (1662–1698)